Kenny Murphy (born 21 July 1966) is a former Irish rugby union international player who played as a full-back.
He played for the Ireland team from 1990 to 1992, winning 11 caps. He was a member of the Ireland squad at the 1991 Rugby World Cup.

He played club rugby for Cork Constitution and provincial rugby for Munster. Both his father and grandfather, Noel Murphy, sr. and Noel Murphy, jr. also played internationally for Ireland.

References

External links
ESPN Profile

1966 births
Living people
Irish rugby union players
Ireland international rugby union players
Rugby union players from County Cork
Cork Constitution players
Munster Rugby players
Rugby union fullbacks